Paulette (po-LET) is the French feminine given name diminutive of the French/English/German given name Pauline, a derivative of
the Latin Paulina, from the Roman family name Paulus, meaning "small" or "humble". The masculine given name Paul comes from the same cognate. It is uncommon as a surname. People with the name "Paulette" include:
 (1900-1984) - French headwear designer
Paulette Bethel - a Bahamian ambassador
Paulette Bourgeois (born 1951) - Canadian children's author
Paulette Carlson (born 1952) - American singer-songwriter
Paulette Cooper (born 1942) - an American author
Paulette Cruz (born 1989) - a Mexican beach volleyball player
Paulette Doan - a Canadian ice dancer
Paulette Dubost (1910–2011) - a French stage and film actress
Paulette Duval (1900-?) - an Argentine-born French/American actress
Paulette Frankl (born 1937) - an American courtroom artist and author
Paulette Gebara Farah (2005–2010) - a Mexican girl whose death was controversial 
Paulette Goddard (1910–1990) - an American film actress
Paulette Irons (born 1952) - an American politician
Paulette Jiles (born 1943) - an American-born Canadian poet and novelist
Paulette McDonagh (1901–1978) - an Australian film director
Paulette Noizeux (1887–1971) - a French film and stage actress
Paulette Phillips - a Canadian artist
Paulette Rakestraw (born 1967), American politician from the state of Georgia
Paulette Randall (born 1961) - an English theatre director
Paulette Reck (born 1968) - an American beauty pageant contestant
Paulette Schwartzmann (1894–1953) - a Latvian–born French/Argentine chess player
Paulette Van Roekens (1895–1988) - a French-born American artist
Paulette Wilson (1956–2020) - a British immigration activist
Paulette Zang Milama (born 1987) - a Gabonese  track and field sprint athlete

References
 

Given names
Feminine given names
French feminine given names